James Ruesch Young (October 24, 1952 - February 15, 2014) was the former president, chief executive officer and chairman of the board for Union Pacific Railroad until his death in February 2014.

Early life and education 
Young graduated from Omaha South High School and the University of Nebraska at Omaha.

On June 7, 2008, Young received a Doctorate of Commerce from Bellevue University.

Career 
He began working for Union Pacific in 1978.  Through a series of promotions he worked his way up the chain of command to be elected president of the railroad in January 2004.  In February 2005, he was elected to the board of directors for the railroad.  On January 1, 2006, he succeeded Richard K. Davidson as CEO of Union Pacific Corporation, the parent company of Union Pacific Railroad.

Young assumed the additional role of chairman of the board of directors as of February 1, 2007. He remained as chairman after stepping down as president and CEO.

Death 

Young died on February 15, 2014, after a two-year battle with pancreatic cancer. He was survived by his wife, three children, and two grandchildren

References 

Bellevue University alumni
Union Pacific Railroad people
1952 births
2014 deaths
21st-century American railroad executives